Mirotani Dam  is an earthfill dam located in Hyogo Prefecture in Japan. The dam is used for flood control and irrigation. The catchment area of the dam is 0.4 km2. The dam impounds about 9  ha of land when full and can store 101 thousand cubic meters of water. The construction of the dam was started on 1986 and completed in 1987.

See also
List of dams in Japan

References

Dams in Hyogo Prefecture